Dallas College is a public community college with seven campuses in Dallas County, Texas. It serves more than 70,000 students annually in degree-granting, continuing education, and adult education programs.

Dallas College offers associate degree and career/technical certificate programs in more than 100 areas of study as well as a bachelor's degree in education. It is one of the largest community college systems in Texas.

History 
Dallas College was founded as the Dallas County Junior College District in 1965, and became known as the Dallas County Community College District (DCCCD) in 1972. The first campus, Dallas College El Centro Campus in downtown Dallas, was established in 1966. Dr. Bill J. Priest served as the founding chancellor from 1965 until his retirement in 1981. In 2020, the Dallas County Community College District renamed the district to Dallas College, while each campus kept its name.

District and service area 
As defined by the Texas Legislature, the official service area of Dallas College includes
all of Dallas County and all territory included in the Carrollton-Farmers Branch Independent School District (a portion of which is in adjacent Denton County).

Dallas College maintains an "open-door" admissions policy regarding new students, allowing many people to attend college who otherwise might not be able to do so.

Campuses 

The seven campuses in Dallas College, with the years they opened, are:
 Dallas College El Centro Campus (1966)
 Dallas College Eastfield Campus (1970)
 Dallas College Mountain View Campus (1970)
 Dallas College Richland Campus (1972)
 Dallas College Cedar Valley Campus (1977)
 Dallas College North Lake Campus (1977)
 Dallas College Brookhaven Campus (1978)
In addition to the seven campuses, several other locations also operate based on the needs of the local community:
 Dallas College Bill J. Priest Center
 Dallas College Cedar Hill Center
 Dallas College Coppell Center
 Dallas College Culinary, Pastry and Hospitality Center
 Dallas College Dental Hygiene Center
 Dallas College Downtown Design Center
 Dallas College Downtown Health Sciences Center
 Dallas College Garland Center
 Dallas College Irving Center
 Dallas College Pleasant Grove Center
 Dallas College R. Jan LeCroy Center
 Dallas College West Dallas Center

Administration 
Dallas College Board of Trustees consists of seven members who are entrusted with governing the district. The board defines the vision of the district, serves as a liaison between the district and the community, approves annual budgets and sets policies, among other responsibilities. Board members are elected officials who serve six-year terms without compensation.

References

External links

 Official website

 
Two-year colleges in Texas
.
Universities and colleges in the Dallas–Fort Worth metroplex